Nunawading Spectres is a NBL1 South club based in Melbourne, Victoria. The club fields a team in both the Men's and Women's NBL1 South. The club is a division of Melbourne East Basketball Association (MEBA), the major administrative basketball organisation in the region. The Spectres play their home games at Nunawading Basketball Centre.

Club history

NBL/WNBL

Nunawading Basketball was established in 1969. In 1979, a Nunawading Spectres men's team entered the National Basketball League (NBL), joining nine other teams for the league's inaugural season. In 1982, a Nunawading Spectres women's team entered the Women's National Basketball League (WNBL) for the league's second season.

In 1987, the Spectres men changed their name to Eastside Spectres and spent five years under that moniker before merging with the Southern Melbourne Saints in 1992 to become the South East Melbourne Magic. During their time in the NBL, the Spectres were two-time grand finalists, losing to Launceston in 1981 and Perth in 1991. The Spectres women played 10 seasons in the WNBL and won six championships, including four in a row between 1986 and 1989.

SEABL/NBL1
In 1990, with the Eastside Spectres still a championship contender in the NBL, a Nunawading Spectres men's team re-emerged in the form of a South East Australian Basketball League (SEABL) franchise. Two years later, the Spectres women joined the men's team in the SEABL after withdrawing from the WNBL following the 1991 season.

In 1995, the men's team collected their first title as they won the CBA East Conference Championship. The women's team were conference runners-up in both 2000 and 2008, while the men were conference runners-up in 1999 and 2004.

In 2011, the men's team won their second conference title and their first SEABL National Championship after defeating the Bendigo Braves 88–61 in the grand final. Spectres guard Shane McDonald was superb as he racked up a game-high 28 points to earn the MVP award.

After finishing as conference runners-up in 2013, the men's team won their third conference title in 2014 behind the likes of Mitch Creek, Tommy Greer, Shane McDonald, Simon Conn and Matt O'Hea. However, they were unsuccessful in claiming National Championship honours after going down to the Mount Gambier Pioneers 85–71 in the grand final.

After finishing as runners-up in the SEABL in 2018, the Spectres won the NBL1 championship in 2019 with a 99–90 win over the Bendigo Braves in the grand final. The NBL1 South season did not go ahead in 2020 due to the COVID-19 pandemic.

NBL Season by season

References

External links
 Nunawading Basketball's official website

South East Australian Basketball League teams
Defunct National Basketball League (Australia) teams
Basketball teams established in 1979
Basketball teams in Melbourne
Sport in the City of Whitehorse